Mark Knowles and Daniel Nestor were the defending champions but lost in the first round to Nicolas Kiefer and Wesley Moodie.

Bob Bryan and Mike Bryan won in the final 6–3, 6–4 against Jeff Coetzee and Chris Haggard.

Seeds

  Bob Bryan /  Mike Bryan (champions)
  Mark Knowles /  Daniel Nestor (first round)
  Scott Humphries /  Mark Merklein (first round)
  Robbie Koenig /  Rick Leach (first round)

Draw

References
 2004 Kroger St. Jude International Doubles Draw

2004 Kroger St. Jude International and the Cellular South Cup
Doubles